Jon Jashni is an American media investor and advisor.

Work 
In 1999, Jashni and Kevin Burns formed Synthesis Entertainment, which develops and produces content based on properties of the Irwin Allen estate such as Poseidon, Voyage to the Bottom of the Sea, The Time Tunnel and Lost in Space.

From 2006 to 2016 Jashni was president and chief creative officer of Legendary Entertainment,  working as a producer and developing film projects including Kong: Skull Island, The Great Wall, Warcraft, Crimson Peak, Godzilla (2014), 42, and Pacific Rim. He also played a key role in corporate dealings including the sale of Legendary to the Dalian Wanda Group Co for $3.5 billion. In 2016 he started Raintree Ventures, an entertainment-related investment fund.

He is an executive producer of a Netflix Lost in Space series released in 2018.

He is a member of the Academy of Motion Picture Arts and Sciences and the Producers Guild of America, and a trustee emeritus of the American Film Institute.

Personal life and education 
Jashni was born in Los Angeles, California. He attended the University of Southern California and graduated in 1984 with a BS in Corporate Finance. He also attended UCLA Anderson School of Management and graduated in 1987 with an MBA in Organizational Behavior.

Filmography

Film

Television 
Associate Producer
 Get Smart, Again! (1989)

Executive producer
 The Time Tunnel (2002)
 The Robinsons: Lost in Space (2004)
 Lost in Space (2018)
 Make It Work (2019)
 Equal (2020)

References 

Film producers from California
Year of birth missing (living people)
Living people
UCLA Anderson School of Management alumni